Aslauga satyroides is a butterfly in the family Lycaenidae. It is found in Cameroon.

References

External links
Images representing Aslauga satyroides at Barcodes of Life

Butterflies described in 1994
Aslauga
Endemic fauna of Cameroon
Butterflies of Africa